Southern Gothic is a 2007 American film starring Yul Vasquez, William Forsythe, Jonathan Sachar and Nicole Duport, directed by Mark Young.

Cast
 Yul Vazquez as Hazel Fortune
 William Forsythe as Pitt
 Jonathan Sachar as Daniel
 Nicole DuPort as Starla
 Dani Englander as Ava
 Emily Catherine Young as Hope
 William Boyer as Virgil
 April Carroll as Firegirl
 Steve Fortner as Zeek
 Brett Gentile as Melvin
 Bob Hungerford as Motel Clerk
 Carrie Anne Hunt as Cheerleader
 Joe Inscoe as Silas Freeman
 Johanna Jowett as Crystal
 David Loyer as Strip Club Patron

References

External links 
 
 

2007 horror films
2007 films
American supernatural horror films
American vampire films
Films directed by Mark Young
2000s American films